Livox Wood is a woodland and Site of Special Scientific Interest (SSSI), noted for its biological characteristics, in Monmouthshire, south east Wales.

Geography
The woods overlook the current grounds used for the Monmouthshire Show, on the other side of the river.

The site is owned by Natural Resources Wales as well as private individuals.

Wildlife and ecology
As with other woodland in the Wye Valley Area of Outstanding Natural Beauty, Livox Wood contains many local and rare tree species. The lower slopes of the wood contain ash (Fraxinus excelsior), black alder (Alnus glutinosa) and wych elm (Ulmus glabra), with Sessile oak Quercus petraea dominating the upper slopes. Other flora of interest include broad leaved sedge (Carex strigosa), the giant bellflower (Campanula latifolia) and toothwort (Lathraea squamaria).

A number of insect, bird and other animal species have been recorded on the site.

References

Forests and woodlands of Monmouthshire
Sites of Special Scientific Interest in Monmouthshire
Sites of Special Scientific Interest notified in 1971